The Sydney County Council (SCC) was formed in 1935 to produce electricity and operate the electricity network in a number of municipalities in metropolitan Sydney. Unlike other New South Wales county councils, which were voluntary associations of local councils to undertake local government activities permitted or required of them by the Local Governnment Act 1919  (including electricity, gas and water supply, flood mitigation, weed control, abbatoirs, airports, town planning), Sydney County Council was established under a separate piece of legislation by the state government to perform the electricity distribution and streetlighting operations of the local government areas concerned. On its establishment it assumed control of the Electricity Department of the Sydney City Council, which was already supplying electricity to other municipalities. In 1952, the SCC lost most its electricity generation functions to the Electricity Commission of New South Wales (established 1950) and retained only its distribution functions. The SCC was merged with other municipal county councils in 1990 to form Sydney Electricity.

History
In 1904, the Municipal Council of Sydney's Electricity Department, one of the two main authorities responsible for electricity generation at the time, began to generate electricity for streetlights in the Sydney central business district. Pyrmont Power Station began operations in 1904, as the Sydney Electric Lighting Station, and was expanded over time. Construction of the Bunnerong Power Station began in 1926, and when Bunnerong 'A' Station was completed in 1937 it had a capacity of 175 MW, making it the largest power station in the State, and further expansion brought its capacity to 375 MW, making Bunnerong the largest power station in the southern hemisphere.

In 1935, the Sydney County Council was formed and took over ownership of the Municipality of Sydney's Electricity Department including its power stations, which by then supplied electricity for domestic, commercial and community uses in addition to the original purpose of supply for street lighting. SCC progressively took over the electricity operations of other local councils in its vicinity. SCC took over the electricity works of Sutherland Shire Council in 1949. After the Electricity Commission of New South Wales was created in 1950 to manage electricity generation and distribution across the state, the SCC's Bunnerong and Pyrmont Power Stations were transferred to it in 1952; and the SCC became an electricity distributor only.

By 1982, Brisbane Water, Mackellar and St George County Councils had merged with SCC. In 1989, the state government legislated to abolish the SCC and other electricity supply county councils formed under the Local Government Act. SCC became Sydney Electricity, a government controlled corporation. County council employees had been entitled to payment for unused accumulated sick leave but the state government legislated to prohibit such, leaving the now state owned corporation of Sydney Electricity with the money but it was required to pay dividends to the state government. In 1996, Sydney Electricity was merged with Orion Energy to form EnergyAustralia, a government-controlled enterprise. The retail business of EnergyAustralia and its name was sold to Hong-Kong listed TRUenergy in 2010, which in 2012, changed its name to EnergyAustralia. On 2 March 2011, the remaining electricity distribution business of EnergyAustralia changed its name to Ausgrid. The state government subsequently leased ownership of Ausgrid, retaining a stake.

Areas and offices

Council areas of responsibility

SCC Offices

Queen Victoria Building, 1935–1968
On 13 December 1935, the Minister for Local Government, Eric Spooner, officially opened the new offices of the Sydney County Council within the Queen Victoria Building on George Street, Sydney, marking the transfer of responsibility from the Electricity Department of the City of Sydney. The redesign of a substantial portion of the Victorian building in the distinctive Art Deco style was undertaken by the Architect's Branch of the City of Sydney, with the primary contractor being Beat Brothers and various fittings supplied by Wunderlich. The works included a demonstration hall, executive offices, electricity showrooms and general offices for County Council staff.

However, the QVB remained under the overall ownership and control of the City of Sydney, with various proposals emerging over subsequent years over the redevelopment of the site and/or its sale to the County Council, which rented its premises from the City Council. By 1945, the present amount of office space was recognised as inadequate for the SCC's needs, and the council authorised the general manager to investigate the possibilities of a new office or substantially remodelling the QVB.

SCC Building, 570 George Street, 1968–1990
No further action was taken until 1957 when the County Council began acquiring sites on the corner of George and Bathurst streets (552A-570 George Street) for the site of a new headquarters building. With acquisitions underway, in 1959 the County Council staged a design competition for the new headquarters, to be judged by an eminent committee of architects, including Max Collard, George Molnar and Walter Osborn McCutcheon. The competition, which closed on 2 May 1960 and attracted 62 entrants, specified that the building had to have "an efficient flexible plan, large areas of open space with a minimum of solid or high partitions, minimum maintenance and operational costs, and a high architectural standard imparting civic dignity consistent with the importance of the site."

The first prize of £5,000 was awarded to a design from prominent Sydney firm Fowell, Mansfield & Maclurcan, with the design attributed to James Kell and Diana Parrott, with input from partner Osmond Jarvis. The winning design took the form of a tall slab block rising above the southern end of a low podium, recalling the seminal modernist International style design of Skidmore, Owings & Merrill’s Lever House in New York completed in 1952. Second prize was awarded to Stephenson & Turner of North Sydney, and the third prize went to Marcus Woodforde. However, when discovering that the headquarters project would cost up £4.5 million, the council voted in August 1961 to abandon the project. In June 1963, the council voted again to restart the aborted headquarters project and re-engaged Fowell, Mansfield, Jarvis & Maclurcan to finalise the design. Site excavation by builders E. A. Watts Pty Ltd began in February 1965 and construction was completed by early 1968, being officially opened by the Governor of NSW, Sir Roden Cutler, on 5 April 1968.

The building, completed at a cost of $9,300,000, at a height of 96.9 metres and 27 storeys with 200,000 square feet of office space to house 1,550 of the SCC's 7,000 staff. The dark exterior of the building contrasted greatly with the nearby QVB, St Andrews Cathedral and Sydney Town Hall, and was achieved by polished black granite cladding, with cladding at the ground floor level lined with marble. The new SCC Building remained the council's primary headquarters until its abolition in 1990. The NSW Government sold the building in 2013–2014.

Other offices and locations
 Testing Laboratory and Northern Depot, 14 Nelson Street and Mowbray Road, Chatswood (1954–1990).
 Central Bulk Stores Building, 87-103 Epsom Road, Rosebery (1956–1990)
 Crows Nest Showroom, 326 Pacific Highway
 Burwood Showroom, 208 Burwood Road
 Campsie Showroom, 257 Beamish Street
 Bondi Junction Showroom, 149 Oxford Street
 Gosford Office, 50 Mann Street Gosford (former Brisbane Water County Council headquarters).
 Manly Office, 48-52 Sydney Road Manly (former Mackellar County Council headquarters)

Badge and motto
In 1936 the new Council adopted a badge for general use and on the Common Seal. A competition was conducted both among staff and the general public, with the final design chosen including the sun to depict heat, the classical torch to depict light and the figure of the horse to depict power. However the original motto of this design, the Latin "Imperium in populo ex populo" ("Power from the people to give the people power"), was not considered a well-constructed Latin phrase by experts, and Professor Frederick Augustus Todd, Professor of Latin and Dean of the Faculty of Arts of the University of Sydney (1930–1937), suggested instead that the motto be "Peractis Postera Praestent" ("Let the future excel the past"). This was accepted by the Council at its 1 September 1936 meeting, with the SCC General Manager, Forbes Mackay, noting: "I consider this motto suitably expresses what I believe to be the aim of the council: to give increasingly better service to the public that it serves."

Chairmen

Council elections and composition
Section 7F(8) of the Electricity Act, 1945 provided that:

17 August 1935 Election

19 January 1938 Election

14 January 1942 Election

9 January 1945 Election

14 February 1946 1st Constituency by-election
On 15 January 1946, Councillor Reginald James Bartley resigned his seat. A by-election was held for the resulting vacancy on the 1st Constituency on 14 February 1946, at which Frank Grenville Pursell (Sydney) was elected unopposed.

19 July 1946 1st Constituency by-election
On 17 June 1946, Councillor and Deputy Chairman Arthur Joseph McElhone died in office. A by-election was held for the resulting vacancy on the 1st Constituency on 19 July 1946, at which William Parker Henson (Sydney) was elected. On 30 July 1946, Councillor Frank Grenville Pursell was elected as deputy chairman.

10 September 1947 2nd Constituency by-election
On 12 August 1947, Councillor Stanley Evan Parry resigned his seat due to ill-health. A by-election was held for the resulting vacancy on the 2nd Constituency on 10 September 1947, at which John Henry Gardiner (Redfern) was elected.

9 February 1949 Election

1 May 1950 1st Constituency by-election
On 18 March 1950, Councillor Joseph Anthony Bodkin died in office. Councillor Daniel Patrick Minogue also resigned his seat. A by-election was held for the two resulting vacancies on the 1st Constituency on 1 May 1950, at which Frank Green (Sydney) and Reginald Arthur Triggs (Strathfield) were elected.

17 January 1951 Election

22 January 1954 Election

7 May 1954 2nd Constituency by-election
On 2 April 1954, Councillor Colin Biggers resigned from office. A by-election was held for his seat on the 2nd Constituency on 7 May 1954, at which Herbert Reuben Thorncraft (Canterbury) was elected.

9 March 1956 4th Constituency by-election
On 23 January 1956, Councillor John Oscar Cramer resigned from office. A by-election was held for his seat on the 4th Constituency on 9 March 1956, at which George Ivan Ferris (Mosman) was elected.

23 January 1957 Election

20 January 1960 Election

23 January 1963 Election

23 December 1964 3rd Constituency by-election
On 10 November 1964, Councillor George Nicholas Elias Dan died in office. A by-election was held for his seat on the 3rd Constituency on 23 December 1964, at which Keith Bates (Sutherland) was elected.

26 January 1966 Election

6 February 1969 Election

10 November 1971 Election

6 November 1974 Election

9 November 1977 Election

5 November 1980 Election

6 June 1984 Election

25 November 1987 Election

General Managers

Notes

References

Sydney County Council
1935 establishments in Australia
1990 disestablishments in Australia
Defunct electric power companies of Australia
Defunct utility companies of New South Wales